Khoresht mast or Khoresh mas (transliterally yogurt chow) is an Iranian side dish. It is served in a cold dish. Historically it is from Isfahan, Iran. It was a royal court main course but now it is served as a pre course or dessert..خورشت ماست اصفهان

References 

Isfahan
Iranian cuisine